Ole Forfang (born 22 March 1995) is a Norwegian racing cyclist. He competed in the men's team time trial event at the 2017 UCI Road World Championships.

Major results
2017
 6th De Kustpijl
 8th Kattekoers
2019
 1st  Overall Tour de Normandie
1st  Young rider classification
1st Stage 4
 6th Volta Limburg Classic

References

External links
 

1995 births
Living people
Norwegian male cyclists
Cyclists from Oslo